Alexander Thomas Kaliyanil S.V.D. (born 27 May 1960) is an Indian Roman Catholic missionary and the current Archbishop of Bulawayo in Zimbabwe.

Biography
Born in Vallachira, Kerala, Kaliyanil joined the Divine Word Missionaries in 1987 and was ordained a priest on 7 May 1988, being sent to Zimbabwe the year after. He holds a Diploma in Economics from Mysore University, India. Since 1989 he has been a missionary in Zimbabwe, in the Archdiocese of Bulawayo, where he held the following positions: 1990–1992: vicar of Holy Cross Parish in Tshabalala, 1992–1997: parish mission Embakwe, 1997–2005: parish priest of St. Joseph Tsholotsho and dean of the Southern and Northern Deanery, 2005–2008: diocesan bursar; since 2001: ex officio director of the Catholic Development Commission (Caritas Zimbabwe) from 2008: regional superior of the Society of the Divine Word in Zimbabwe. He became archdiocesan treasurer in 2005, and the local superior of the Divine Word Missionaries in 2008.

On 20 June 2009, Kaliyanil was appointed the third archbishop of Bulawayo by Pope Benedict XVI. He succeeds the politically outspoken Pius Ncube, who resigned as archbishop in September 2007 amid accusations of adultery.

References

1960 births
Living people
People from Thrissur district
21st-century Roman Catholic archbishops in Zimbabwe
Indian Roman Catholic missionaries
Roman Catholic missionaries in Zimbabwe
Divine Word Missionaries Order
Indian emigrants to Zimbabwe
Roman Catholic archbishops of Bulawayo
Indian Roman Catholics
Indian Roman Catholic archbishops